Follow the Boys may refer to:
 Follow the Boys (1944 film), an American musical film
 Follow the Boys (1963 film), an American comedy film
 Follow the Boys (song), a song by Connie Francis, from the 1963 film

See also
 Follow Me, Boys!, a 1966 American drama film